Palaniswamy, better known by his stage name Sivakumar (born 27 October 1941), is an Indian visual artist and former actor who has portrayed a wide range of leading and supporting roles onscreen in Tamil cinema and television. He made his acting debut in A. C. Trilogchander's Kakkum Karangal (1965). He has acted in over 190 movies in Tamil. He is the father of actors Suriya and Karthi. He is also ambidextrous. He has won 3 Filmfare Award South and 2 Tamil Nadu State Film Award in his Film Career.

Career 
Palaniswamy made his acting debut in Kakkum Karangal (1965) with the actor S. S. Rajendran. Palaniswamy was renamed as Sivakumar when he entered the industry.

Sivakumar’s notable movies include Saraswati Sabatham (1966), Kandhan Karunai (1967), Thirumal Perumai (1968) and Uyarndha Manithan (1968), Rosappu Ravikkaikari (1979) and the very famous K. Balachander’s Sindhu Bhairavi (1985). He won the Filmfare Award for Best Actor – Tamil for the movies  Rosappu Ravikkaikari (1979), Vandichakkaram (1980) and a Lifetime Achievement Award – South (2007). He also was the recipient of the Tamil Nadu State Film Awards for the movies Avan Aval Adhu (1980) and Agni Sakshi (1982).

He has co-starred with many leading Tamil actors of three generations, including  M. G. Ramachandran, Sivaji Ganesan, Gemini Ganesan, S.S. Rajendran, R. Muthuraman, A.V.M. Rajan, Jaishankar, Ravichandran, Kamal Haasan, Rajinikanth, Vijayakanth, Sathyaraj, Sarath Kumar, Prabhu, Karthik, Mohan, Arjun Sarja, Ajith Kumar, Vijay, Vikram and Suriya. He acted in famous TV serials like Chithi and Annamalai alongside Raadhika.

In 2012, Sivakumar was honoured with the Jaya TV Lifetime Achievement Award at the Anna Centenary Library. The award was to honour him for his commendable contribution to the Tamil film industry for over 40 years.

In recent times, he has ventured into public speaking, giving his opinion on various subjects, including Hindu theology. He has been praised for the fluency and style of his speeches.

Personal life 

Sivakumar was born on 27 October 1941 in Coimbatore. He is married to Lakshmi Kumari and the couple has three children; two sons who are actors, Suriya and Karthi and a daughter Brindha who is a playback singer. He is a devout Hindu and a devotee of Lord Murugan. Sivakumar's elder daughter-in-law Jyothika is a Kollywood actress.

Filmography

1960s

1970s

1980s

1990s

2000s

As dubbing artiste

2010s

Television 
 Kaiyalavu Manasu (1990)
 Revathi
 Pusphanjali
 Veettukku Veedu Vasapadi
 Bandham (1994)
 Ethanai Manidhargal (1997)
 Aachi International (1997–1998)
 Dhik Dhik Dhik (1999)
 Kaveri (1999–2001)
 Chithi (1999–2001)
 Annamalai (2002–2005)
 Lakshmi (2006–2008)

Awards 
Sivakumar is a three-time recipient of Filmfare Awards South and a two-time winner of Tamil Nadu State Film Awards.

Filmfare Awards South
 1979 – Best Actor – Tamil for Rosaappo Ravikkai Kaari
 1980 – Best Actor – Tamil for Vandichakkaram
 2007 – Filmfare Lifetime Achievement Award

Tamil Nadu State Film Awards
 1979 – Best Actor Award for Avan aval adhu
 1982 – Best Actor Award for Agni Sakshi

Anna Centenary Library
 2012 –  Lifetime Achievement Award

Norway Tamil Film Festival Awards
 2015 – Norway Tamil Film Festival Kalaichigaram Award

Vijay Awards
 2018 – Vijay Award for Contribution to Tamil Cinema

References

External links 

B.Meenakshi Sundaram Story of Sivakumar's Love Affair with Yoga

1941 births
Living people
Tamil male actors
Male actors from Tamil Nadu
Male actors in Tamil cinema
Tamil Nadu State Film Awards winners
Filmfare Awards South winners
People from Coimbatore district
20th-century Indian male actors
21st-century Indian male actors
Artists from Chennai